Hillbilly Hit Parade is a compilation album featuring American country music artist George Jones and other country music artists from the Starday record label, including Leon Payne and Jeanette Hicks. It was released in 1958.  The album includes Jones's first chart hit "Why Baby Why" and one of his few rock and roll cuts, a cover of the Elvis Presley smash "Heartbreak Hotel".  It is the second studio album release for George Jones.

Track listing
"Why Baby Why" (performed by George Jones)
"You Are The One" (performed by Leon Payne)
"Searching" (performed by Jeanette Hicks)
"Any Old Time" (performed by George Jones)
"I Take the Chance" (performed by George Jones & Jeanette Hicks)
"Conscience I'm Guilty" (performed by Benny Barnes)
"Hold Everything" (performed by George Jones)
"I Want You, I Need You, I Love You" (performed by Eddie Blank)
"Crazy Arms" (performed by Leon Payne)
"You Gotta Be My Baby" (performed by George Jones)
"I Walk the Line" (performed by Bennie Barnes)
"Sweet Dreams" (performed by George Jones)
"Blackboard Of My Heart" (performed by Leon Payne)
"A Satisfied Mind" (performed by Joe "Red" Hayes)
"Yes I Know Why" (performed by George Jones)
"Heartbreak Hotel" (performed by George Jones as 'Thumper Jones')

1958 compilation albums
George Jones compilation albums
Starday Records compilation albums